The Panther River is a major tributary of the Red Deer River in Western Alberta. The river flows into the Red Deer River near Alberta Highway 40.

Tributaries

References

Rivers of Alberta